Charles Edgar Ray (March 15, 1891 – November 23, 1943) was an American actor, director, producer, and screenwriter. Ray rose to fame during the mid-1910s portraying young, wholesome hicks in silent comedy films.

Early life
Ray was born in Jacksonville, Illinois, and moved to Springfield as a child where he attended elementary school. He then moved to Needles, California, for a time before finally relocating to Los Angeles where he finished his education. He began his career on the stage before working for director Thomas H. Ince as a film extra in silent shorts I’m December 1912. He appeared in several bit parts before moving on to supporting roles. Ray's breakthrough role came in 1915 when he co-starred opposite Frank Keenan in one of his first full length feature, the historical American Civil War drama The Coward. The film was a box office success and critics praised Ray’s mannerisms and natural acting style.

Career
Ray's popularity grew after appearing in a series of light silent comedy features which cast him in juvenile roles, primarily young, wholesome hicks or naive, unsophisticated "country bumpkins" that foiled the plans of thieves or con men and won the heart of his dream girl. In March 1917, he signed with Paramount Pictures and resumed working with director Thomas H. Ince. By 1920, Ray enjoyed critical and commercial success and was earning a reported $11,000 a week (approximately $ today). As Ray’s public popularity continued, he had gained a reputation in Hollywood for being difficult and egomaniacal. In 1920, he abruptly left Paramount after studio head Adolph Zukor refused to give him a substantial pay raise. Zukor later wrote in his autobiography, The Public Is Never Wrong, that Ray's ego and behavior had become problematic and that Ray "... was headed for trouble and [I] did not care to be with him when he found it." Ray soon formed his own production company, Charles Ray Productions, and used his fortune to purchase a studio on Sunset Boulevard in Los Angeles (now known as the KCET Studios) where he planned to produce and shoot his own films.

Ray's first independent production, 45 Minutes from Broadway, was released in August 1920 and was fairly successful but not as successful as his previous films. In February 1921, he produced and starred in The Old Swimmin' Hole, the first full length, American silent film that did not have intertitles to further the plot. The film drew critical acclaim for going against convention and for featuring a simple plot that was easy to follow without intertitles. Critics also praised Ray’s ability to act convincingly despite a lack of intertitles.  Despite the critical acclaim, the film was only shown for a short time in theaters in larger cities (where more sophisticated, big city audiences were more likely to accept experimental films and concepts) because the film featured Ray in a country bumpkin role. In February 1922, he signed a long term contract with United Artists.

By the time Ray signed with United Artists, he had grown tired of playing country bumpkin and juvenile characters in comedy films. In an effort to change his image to that of a romantic leading man, Ray chose to produce an epic historical drama film based on The Courtship of Miles Standish, an 1858 narrative poem by Henry Wadsworth Longfellow. The poem centers around a love triangle between early American settlers John Alden, Miles Standish, and Priscilla Mullens. In November 1922, Ray announced that he would portray the lead role of John Alden in the film. He stated, "There will be immense satisfaction to me in playing a real character, not the puppet of some author's invention."

In her book Off With Their Heads!: A Serio-Comic Tale Of Hollywood, screenwriter Frances Marion wrote that numerous people attempted to dissuade Ray from making the film because lengthy costume dramas were not box office draws at the time. Ray chose not to listen to the advice and, after failing to secure financial backing from a major studio, he put up $500,000 (approximately $ today) of his own money to finance the film. Ray began filming The Courtship of Miles Standish in January 1923 at his namesake studio on Sunset Boulevard. Production costs quickly rose as Ray spent money with abandon. In addition to the $65,000 (approximately $ today) 180-ton replica of the Mayflower that was set on a mechanism to simulate it being on rough seas, Ray also had full sized log cabins built solely for exterior shots. By the end of filming, Ray had invested all of his saving, nearly $2 million (approximately $ today), and borrowed additional funds at a 30% interest rate to finish the film. The film's final budget was estimated at $3 million (approximately $ today).

 
Released to theaters on December 30, 1923, The Courtship of Miles Standish received some critical acclaim, mainly for its cinematography, but received generally lukewarm reviews and was a box office failure. Ray lost all of the money he invested in the film and, due to the film’s box office failure, his popularity quickly declined. Thomas Ince, who had worked with Ray early in his career, attempted to help Ray by casting him in the drama Dynamite Smith (1924), directed by Ince's brother Ralph. The film did little to help boost Ray's popularity. While he continued working in films until the 1940s, Ray never regained the popularity he once attained. For the remainder of his career, he was relegated to small supporting and uncredited extra work.

Decline and later years
In December 1925, Ray was forced to file for bankruptcy after being sued by more than a dozen creditors for monies owed and back taxes. His production company also declared bankruptcy. Actress Jane Novak later recalled that Ray's wife Clara Grant (whom he married in November 1915) contributed to Ray's egomania and spendthrift ways. The couple lived in a lavish Beverly Hills home equipped with gold doorknobs, several lacquered pianos, black marble bathtubs with gold fixtures and a full sized tree made of semi-precious stones that sat in their bathroom. They employed a full staff of servants and owned a fleet of luxury cars. Grant bought expensive dresses that she refused to wear more than once and traveled in a Rolls-Royce with an ermine floor rug. The day before Ray was to file for bankruptcy, the couple held a dinner party with a personal butler for each of their guests at their home that reportedly cost $30,000. Film executive Pat Powers attended the party and asked Ray, "... how can you do this if you're going bankrupt tomorrow? Who will pay the bills? And he [Ray] said, 'we thought it was the thing to do.'"

In 1928, Ray appeared in his final silent film, The Count of Ten, in which he had a supporting role. From 1929 to 1931, he appeared in stage roles in off-Broadway productions but found little success. He returned to the screen in 1932's The Bride's Bereavement; or, The Snake in the Grass, a comedy short and his first sound film. In July 1934, Ray filed for bankruptcy for a second time. He and wife Clara Grant, from whom he had been separated since 1930, divorced in May 1935.

In an attempt to earn money and revive  his career, Ray began writing. In 1935, he released a collection of short stories entitled Hollywood Shorts. In September 1936, he began publishing a magazine called Charles Ray's Hollywood Digest. The magazine featured a mixture of humorous stories and jokes, film reviews and industry news and editorials and articles written by actors and directors including Melvyn Douglas, Groucho Marx and Cecil B. DeMille. In the magazine's first issue, Ray wrote a story which poked fun at then popular and influential gossip columnist Walter Winchell entitled “Is Winchell a Heel?” (“Heel” being slang for a contemptible person).  The magazine folded in 1937 after just two issues due to a lack of public interest.

Ray returned to film work again where he earned a reported $11 a day as a featured extra. On June 4, 1941, he married for a second time to French actress Yvonne Guerin. Guerin died the following year. During his final years, Ray struggled with poor health but continued to work in bit roles. He ended his career in uncredited bit roles in Slightly Dangerous (1943) and An American Romance, which was released a year after his death.

Death
On November 23, 1943, Ray died of a systemic infection caused by an impacted wisdom tooth  at Cedars of Lebanon Hospital in Los Angeles for which he had been hospitalized six weeks prior.
He is buried at Forest Lawn Memorial Park in an unmarked grave in Glendale, California.

For his contribution to the motion picture industry, Charles Ray received a star on the Hollywood Walk of Fame on February 8, 1960, located at 6355 Hollywood Boulevard.

Filmography

References

External links

 
 Charles Ray at Virtual History

1891 births
1943 deaths
20th-century American male actors
American male film actors
Film producers from California
American male screenwriters
American short story writers
American male silent film actors
American male stage actors
Burials at Forest Lawn Memorial Park (Glendale)
Male actors from Illinois
Silent film directors
People from Jacksonville, Illinois
American male short story writers
People from Needles, California
Film directors from California
Film directors from Illinois
Screenwriters from California
Screenwriters from Illinois
Film producers from Illinois
20th-century American male writers
20th-century American screenwriters